Jan Hájek and Robin Vik were the defending champions; however, Hajek chose to compete in Rome instead and Vik chose not to compete this year.
Martin Fischer and Philipp Oswald won in the final 2–6, 7–6(6), [10–8], against Tomasz Bednarek and Mateusz Kowalczyk.

Seeds

Draw

Draw

References
 Doubles Draw

Prosperita Open - Doubles
2010 Doubles